Allvelo (Allmänna Velocipedförsäljnings AB) was a company founded by Fritiof Karlström in Landskrona, Sweden. The company began by importing bicycles, but soon decided to purchase unassembled Waltham Orient buckboards from the United States.  These they assembled and sold as All-Velos under the names Allvelo Orient and Allvelo Pansarmobil Sport. All told, probably around 50 were assembled.  Most parts other than the steering, axles, and engines were of wood.  Each car had a single-cylinder air-cooled engine mounted at the rear, with friction drive. Brakes were fitted on the right rear wheel only, and the cars had tiller steering.

Other models
Other models assembled included the French Orel, as Allvelo Orel, and a UK made truck, under the name Allvelo Vulcan. In 1907 they made a prototype car of their own design, but it never entered into production. At most the company had about 150 employees.

References

Brass Era vehicles
Defunct motor vehicle manufacturers of Sweden
Goods manufactured in Sweden